The Inherent Resolve Campaign Medal is a United States Department of Defense service award and campaign medal. The medal was established by Executive Order on 30 March 2016 by U.S. President Barack Obama. The medal may be awarded to members of the U.S. Army, Navy, Marine Corps, Air Force, and Coast Guard, for service in Iraq, Syria, or contiguous waters or airspace retroactively from 15 June 2014 to a date yet to be determined. Service members who were awarded the Global War on Terrorism Expeditionary Medal for service that is now covered by the Inherent Resolve Campaign Medal may make application to be awarded the Inherent Resolve Campaign Medal in lieu of the Global War on Terrorism Expeditionary Medal. No service member will be entitled to the Global War on Terrorism Expeditionary Medal and Inherent Resolve Campaign Medal for the same action, time period, or service.

Symbolism 
According to the United States Army Institute of Heraldry's website, the medal's mailed fist and dagger represent "strength and courage in the defense of liberty and freedom".  The scorpion being impaled was chosen because, "The scorpion, symbolic for treachery and destruction, is found on most major land masses."

The center of the ribbon is orange in color, surrounded by tan and blue, deriving its hues from the Ishtar Gate and the color of Southwestern Eurasian topography, which is primarily sand.

Criteria 
To qualify for the Inherent Resolve Campaign Medal, personnel must have been attached to a unit based in Iraq or Syria, fly missions over those countries, and/or serve in contiguous waters for 30 days consecutive, or non-consecutive. Service members who were killed or were medically evacuated from those countries due to wounds or injuries immediately qualify for the award, as do members who engaged in combat. Navy, Marine Corps, and Air Force personnel qualify for the Inherent Resolve Campaign Medal only after 30 qualifying days consecutive or non-consecutive. With the release of NAVADMIN 219/22, Effective 1 July 2022, eligibility for the IRCM is limited to the country of Syria and its associated airspace and contiguous waters out to 12 nautical miles. 

Eligible personnel will be awarded one medal with campaign star upon meeting the initial criteria for the award. Service in subsequent campaign phases qualifies personnel for additional campaign stars.

Campaign phases and devices
The following are the approved campaign phases and respective inclusive dates for the Inherent Resolve Campaign Medal:

Examples of campaign stars worn on the Inherent Resolve Campaign service ribbon:

The following ribbon devices are authorized for wear on the Inherent Resolve Campaign Medal:

  Campaign stars (all branches)
  Arrowhead device (Army, Air Force, and Space Force)
  Fleet Marine Force Combat Operation Insignia (Navy personnel assigned to a Marine Corps unit in combat)

References

Further reading

External links

Official website

Awards established in 2016
United States campaign medals